Richard Bevan may refer to:
 Richard Bevan (banker, born 1788) (1788–1870), British banker and philanthropist
 Richard Alexander Bevan (1834–1918), his son, British banker and philanthropist
 Richard Bevan (Royal Navy officer) (1885–1976), British Royal Navy officer
 G. Richard Bevan (born 1959), American attorney and judge

See also
 Rick Bevan ( 1927), Australian rugby league player